Only Fools and Horses.... is a British television sitcom created and written by John Sullivan. Seven series were originally broadcast on BBC One in the United Kingdom from 1981 to 1991, with sixteen sporadic Christmas specials aired until the end of the show in 2003. Set in working-class Peckham in south-east London, it stars David Jason as ambitious market trader Derek "Del Boy" Trotter and Nicholas Lyndhurst as his younger brother Rodney Trotter, alongside a supporting cast. The series follows the Trotters' highs and lows in life, in particular their attempts to get rich. Critically and popularly acclaimed, the series received numerous awards, including recognition from BAFTA, the National Television Awards and the Royal Television Society, as well as winning individual accolades for both Sullivan and Jason. It was voted Britain's Best Sitcom in a 2004 BBC poll. 

Lennard Pearce appeared in the first three series as Del and Rodney's elderly grandad. After Pearce's death in 1984, the show replaced Grandad with Uncle Albert, the boys' great uncle, played by Buster Merryfield. From 1988 onwards, the show features regular characters in Del Boy and Rodney's love interests, Raquel (Tessa Peake-Jones) and Cassandra (Gwyneth Strong) respectively. Other recurring characters include car dealer Boycie (John Challis), road sweeper Trigger (Roger Lloyd-Pack), lorry driver Denzil (Paul Barber), spiv Mickey Pearce (Patrick Murray), Boycie's wife Marlene (Sue Holderness), and pub landlord Mike (Kenneth MacDonald).

The show was not an immediate hit with viewers and received little promotion early on, but later achieved consistently high ratings, and the 1996 episode "Time on Our Hands" (originally billed as the last episode) holds the record for the highest UK audience for a sitcom episode, attracting 24.3 million viewers. The series influenced British culture, contributing several words and phrases to the English language. It spawned an extensive range of merchandise, including books, videos, DVDs, toys, and board games. Episodes are frequently repeated on UKTV comedy channel Gold.

A spin-off series, The Green Green Grass, ran for four series in the UK from 2005 to 2009. A prequel, Rock & Chips, ran for three specials in 2010 and 2011. A special Sport Relief episode aired in March 2014, guest starring David Beckham. In February 2019, a musical adaptation of the show, written by John Sullivan's son Jim Sullivan and Paul Whitehouse, was launched at the Theatre Royal Haymarket, London.

Plot 
Derek "Del Boy" Trotter (played by David Jason), a South London "fly" trader, lives in a council flat in a high-rise tower block, Nelson Mandela House, in Peckham, South London, with his much younger brother, Rodney (Nicholas Lyndhurst), and their elderly grandad (Lennard Pearce). Their mother, Joan, died when Rodney was young, and their father Reg absconded soon afterwards, so Del became Rodney's surrogate father and the family patriarch. Despite the difference in age, personality and outlook, the brothers share a constant bond throughout.

The Trotters attempt to become millionaires through questionable get-rich-quick schemes and by buying and selling poor-quality and illegal goods. They have a three-wheeled Reliant Regal van and trade under the name of Trotters Independent Traders, mainly on the black market.

Initially, Del Boy, Rodney and Grandad were the only regulars, along with the occasional appearances of road sweeper Trigger (Roger Lloyd-Pack) and pretentious used car salesman Boycie (John Challis). Over time, the cast expanded, mostly in the form of regulars at the local pub The Nag's Head. These included pub landlord Mike Fisher (Kenneth MacDonald), lorry driver Denzil (Paul Barber), youthful spiv Mickey Pearce (Patrick Murray) and Boycie's flirtatious wife Marlene (Sue Holderness). After Grandad died following the death of actor Lennard Pearce, his younger brother Uncle Albert (Buster Merryfield) emerged and moved in with Del and Rodney, becoming a main character. 

The plots of many early episodes were primarily self-contained, with few plot lines mentioned again, but the show developed a story arc and an ongoing episodic dimension in later series. Del and Rodney's quest for love is a recurring theme, which eventually resulted in them finding long-term love in the form of Raquel (Tessa Peake-Jones) and Cassandra (Gwyneth Strong) respectively; Del also has a son with Raquel, Damien (played by five actors, most recently Ben Smith). The Trotters finally become millionaires, lose their fortune, and then regain some of it.

Cast and characters

Main cast and characters 
 Derek Edward "Del Boy" Trotter (David Jason)— Del is a smooth-talking South London market trader, willing to sell anything to anyone to make money. Possessing a quick wit and confidence that his younger brother mostly lacks, Del is devoted to his family, taking care of Rodney and Grandad on his own from the age of 16. Del is also known for his penchant for cultural faux pas, in particular his misuse of French phrases. Del never settled down with a woman until he met Raquel, with whom he had a son, Damien.
Sullivan recalled that he had always been fascinated by the unlicensed traders who sold goods from suitcases in markets, and he based Del Boy on them. David Jason added other elements to the part, including Del's cheap gold jewellery and his camel coat. The inspiration was taken from a similar man he had known when working as an electrician. Jason was a relatively late candidate for the part: Jim Broadbent (who would later appear in a minor recurring role as DCI Roy Slater) and Enn Reitel were earlier preferences. At the time, Broadbent was appearing in Mike Leigh's play, "Goose-Pimples", at the Hampstead Theatre in north London. The play was due to transfer to the West End, and consequently, Broadbent thought he would be unable to fit in with the filming schedule and turned down the part. It was only when producer Ray Butt saw a repeat of Open All Hours that Jason was considered and, despite concerns that Jason had not previously had a leading television role, and that he and Lyndhurst did not look like brothers, he was cast.

 Rodney Charlton Trotter (Nicholas Lyndhurst) — Rodney is Del's idealistic but socially awkward younger half-brother. Despite being more academically gifted than Del Boy (although only to the extent of two GCEs), Rodney lacks Del's charisma as well as the latter's duplicitous persona and as such is confined to being Del's dogsbody and sidekick. Orphaned when young, Rodney was raised by Del, and much of the friction between the two comes from Rodney's annoyance about his dependency on his brother and his sometimes immoral schemes, usually resulting in unsuccessful attempts to gain greater independence through girlfriends or through setting up his own businesses; he was only partially successful after marrying Cassandra and briefly going to work for her father. In contrast to Del, the part of Rodney was cast early, with Lyndhurst settled on quickly. Sullivan partly based Rodney on his own experiences: he, too, had a much older sibling and, like Rodney, claims to have been a dreamer and an idealist in his youth.
 Edward Kitchener "Grandad" Trotter (Lennard Pearce) — Sullivan was fascinated by the idea of having a big age gap between Del Boy and his younger brother Rodney; the elderly character of Grandad, and later, Uncle Albert, gave the situation the voice of an old man who had seen it all. In casting the role of Grandad, Sullivan had in mind an actor similar to Wilfrid Brambell, who had played Albert Steptoe in Steptoe and Son, but chose not to use Brambell himself, thinking him too closely associated with Steptoe. After seeing Pearce's audition, Sullivan chose him immediately. Unkempt and absent-minded, although sometimes displaying a high intelligence, Grandad rarely left the flat or even moved from his armchair in front of two television sets. Despite his age he was invariably treated as a butler by Del and Rodney, often being assigned unsavoury jobs around the flat such as cooking meals. Pearce died in 1984 whilst filming the series four episode "Hole in One" (several scenes were subsequently re-shot with Buster Merryfield) and Sullivan wrote a new episode, "Strained Relations", which featured Grandad's funeral.
 Albert Gladstone Trotter (Buster Merryfield) — Shortly after the death of Lennard Pearce, it was decided that a new older family member should be brought in, which eventually led to "Uncle Albert", Grandad's estranged younger brother. Merryfield was an inexperienced amateur actor at the time, but was selected because he appeared to fit the description of an old sailor, especially with his distinctive white "Captain Birdseye" beard. Albert first appeared at Grandad's funeral, and soon moved in with Del and Rodney. His wartime experiences with the Royal Navy became one of the show's running gags, usually beginning with the words "During the war...". Merryfield died in 1999 and Albert's death was written into the next episode.
 Raquel Turner (Tessa Peake-Jones) — Raquel was introduced because Sullivan wanted more female characters and for Del to start meeting more mature women. Her first appearance, in "Dates", was intended to be a one-off, but she was written in again a year later and thereafter became a permanent cast member. A trained singer and actress whose career never took off, she met Del through a dating agency, but they fell out over her part-time job as a stripper, before getting together again. This time she moved in with Del, helping to calm him, and they had a son together, named Damien. As the character unfolded, it was revealed that she was previously married to Del's rival, DCI Roy Slater.
 Cassandra Trotter (née Parry) (Gwyneth Strong) — Cassandra first met Rodney in "Yuppy Love". Their relationship blossomed, and by the end of series six the two had married. Cassandra's career-driven lifestyle caused fights with Rodney, and their troubled marriage was one of the main storylines later in the show's run.

Supporting cast and characters 
 Trigger (Roger Lloyd-Pack) — A dopey and slow-witted but good friend of Del, Trigger was initially portrayed as a small-time thief, supplying Del with dubious goods. In later episodes he came to adopt the "village idiot" role, and constantly calls Rodney "Dave", much to Rodney's chagrin. Trigger, apparently so called because he looks like a horse, was the principal supporting character earlier in the show's run, although his importance lessened as the series progressed. Lloyd-Pack was cast by pure chance: Ray Butt, who hired him to portray Trigger after seeing him in a stage play, had only attended that play to observe potential Del Boy actor Billy Murray.
 Boycie (John Challis) — An untrustworthy used car salesman and a cultural elitist. Boycie, a freemason, was very selfish and prone to boasting about his wealth. Challis had played a similar character in an episode of Citizen Smith. Sullivan liked him, and promised to cast him in a future series, which led to Boycie. Boycie later featured in a spin-off series, The Green Green Grass, starting in 2005, in which he and his wife Marlene along with their son Tyler escaped from a criminal gang.
 Denzil Tulser (Paul Barber) — An affable Liverpudlian lorry driver, Denzil was often on the victim of Del's scams. His inability to say no to Del's business deals frequently led to arguments with his controlling wife, Corinne (Eva Mottley), who was only sighted once, in "Who's a Pretty Boy?". Corinne eventually walked out on him, leaving Denzil depressed but with more time to go along with Del's antics.
 Sid (Roy Heather) — Sid made sparse appearances throughout the show's run, mainly as the proprietor of the dirty and derelict local cafe. In the episode "The Jolly Boys' Outing", it is revealed that Sid fought in the Second World War. He was captured and imprisoned but escaped, only for the boat he was using to be hit and sunk by a Greek fishing trawler being steered by Uncle Albert. After Nag's Head landlord Mike was imprisoned, Sid took over and kept that role for the remainder of the series.
 Mickey Pearce (Patrick Murray) — Mickey was a young, arrogant spiv and friend of Rodney's, known for his exaggerated boasts about his success in business or with women. Despite their friendship, Mickey often took advantage of Rodney's inexperience by stealing his girlfriends or making off with all the money from their business partnership.
 Marlene Boyce (Sue Holderness) — Boycie's wife. Initially just an unseen character, Marlene was popular among the boys and extremely flirtatious, having had implied sexual relations with all of Boycie's friends. She and Del have a noticeably close friendship, dating back to when Marlene worked in a betting shop in Lewisham Grove. Despite their constant arguments and insults, she and Boycie are in-love and eventually have a child, Tyler, although there are light-hearted rumours that Del may be the father.
 Mike Fisher (Kenneth MacDonald) — The landlord of the Nag's Head, although not from the very beginning; his predecessor was never seen, with just a succession of barmaids providing service. Friendly and gormless, he was often targeted by Del as a potential customer for any goods he was selling. When Kenneth MacDonald died in 2001, a storyline involving Mike's imprisonment for attempting to embezzle the brewery was written, and cafe owner Sid took over as the interim pub landlord.
 Damien Trotter (various) — Damien was Del and Raquel's son. It was Rodney's mocking suggestion that he be named Damien. Six actors played Damien: Patrick McManus (1991), Grant Stevens (1991), Robert Liddement (1992), Jamie Smith (1993–96), Douglas Hodge (1996, as adult), and Ben Smith (2001–03).

Minor cast and characters 

The most frequent roles for guest actors in Only Fools and Horses were as Del or Rodney's once-seen girlfriends, barmaids at the Nag's Head, or individuals the Trotters were doing business with. Del and Rodney's deceased mother, Joan, though never seen, cropped up in Del's embellished accounts of her final words or in his attempts to emotionally blackmail Rodney. Her grave – a flamboyant monument – was seen occasionally. Their absent father, Reg, appeared once in "Thicker Than Water" (played by Peter Woodthorpe), before leaving under a cloud, never to be seen again.  Other members of the Trotter family were rarely sighted, the exceptions being cousins Stan (Mike Kemp) and Jean  (Maureen Sweeney), who attended Grandad's funeral. In "The Second Time Around", the woman they believed to be Auntie Rose (Beryl Cooke) turned out to be no relation at all but the woman who had moved into Rose's house some years earlier. After Rodney met Cassandra, her parents Alan (Denis Lill) and Pam (Wanda Ventham) became recurring characters. Raquel's parents, James and Audrey (Michael Jayston and Ann Lynn), appeared in "Time On Our Hands", and it was James who discovered the antique watch which made the Trotters millionaires.

In some episodes, a guest character was essential to the plot. Del's ex-fiancée Pauline (Jill Baker) dominated Del's libido in "The Second Time Around", prompting Rodney and Grandad to leave. In "Who Wants to Be a Millionaire", Del's old business partner Jumbo Mills (Nick Stringer) wanted Del to return to Australia with him and restore their partnership, forcing Del to make a decision. In "Happy Returns", Del stops a young boy from running into the road and takes him home to his mother to discover she is an old flame from nineteen years ago, June Snell (Diane Langton) and the episode revolves around whether her daughter Debby (Oona Kirsch) is actually Del's child, complicated by the fact that Rodney is dating her. June also appears in "A Royal Flush", attending an opera. An attempt by Lennox (Vas Blackwood) to rob a local supermarket set-up the "hostage" situation in "The Longest Night". Del and Rodney spent the whole of "Tea for Three" battling each other for the affections of Trigger's niece Lisa (Gerry Cowper), who briefly reappeared in "The Frog's Legacy". Abdul (Tony Anholt) in "To Hull and Back" and Arnie (Philip McGough) in "Chain Gang" were responsible for setting up dubious enterprises involving the Trotters in their respective episodes. Tony Angelino (Philip Pope), the singing dustman with a speech impediment, was the key to the humour and the storyline of "Stage Fright" and EastEnders actor Derek Martin guest starred in "Fatal Extraction".

Del's nemesis from his school days, corrupt policeman DCI Roy Slater (played by Jim Broadbent), made three appearances, in "May The Force Be With You", "To Hull and Back" and "Class of '62". Feared local villains, the Driscoll Brothers (Roy Marsden and Christopher Ryan) featured once, in "Little Problems", but were mentioned in two previous episodes ("Video Nasty" and "The Frog's Legacy"), and are important in the story of The Green Green Grass. A grown-up Damien (Douglas Hodge) appeared in "Heroes and Villains". Rodney and Mickey's friends, the smooth-talking Jevon (Steven Woodcock) and then, briefly, Chris (Tony Marshall), a ladies' hairdresser, featured sporadically during the sixth and seventh series and the intervening Christmas specials. The two-part 1991 Christmas special, "Miami Twice", saw Richard Branson and Barry Gibb make cameo appearances. Mike Read appeared as himself, hosting an episode of Top Of The Pops, in "It's Only Rock and Roll" and Jonathan Ross appeared as himself in "If They Could See Us Now".

While their characters were less significant, well-known actors who played cameos in the programme included Joan Sims, best known for her numerous roles in the Carry On films, who guest-starred in the feature-length episode "The Frog's Legacy" as an aunt of Trigger and old friend of Del's late mother; successful film actor David Thewlis, who played a young wannabe musician in "It's Only Rock and Roll"; John Bardon, who played the role of Jim Branning in the soap opera EastEnders, as the supermarket security officer in "The Longest Night". Walter Sparrow, who appeared as Dirty Barry in "Danger UXD", went on to appear in several Hollywood films.

Production

Development 

In 1980, John Sullivan, a scriptwriter under contract at the BBC, was already well known as the writer of the sitcom Citizen Smith. It came to an end that year and Sullivan was searching for a new project. An initial idea for a comedy set in the world of football was rejected by the BBC, as was his alternative idea, a sitcom centring on a cockney market trader in working class, modern-day London. The latter idea persisted. Through Ray Butt, a BBC producer and director whom Sullivan had met and become friends with when they were working on Citizen Smith, a draft script was shown to the BBC's Head of Comedy, John Howard Davies. Davies commissioned Sullivan to write a full series. Sullivan believed the key factor in its being accepted was the success of ITV's new drama, Minder, a series with a similar premise and also set in modern-day London.

Sullivan had initially given the show the working title Readies. For the actual title he intended to use, as a reference to the protagonist's tax- and work-evading lifestyle, Only Fools and Horses. That name was based on a genuine, though very obscure, saying, "only fools and horses work for a living", which had its origins in 19th-century American vaudeville. "Only Fools and Horses" had also been the title of an episode of Citizen Smith, and Sullivan liked the expression and thought it was suited to the new sitcom. He also thought longer titles would attract attention. He was first overruled on the grounds that the audience would not understand the title, but he eventually got his way.

Filming and transmission 

Filming of the first series began in May 1981, and the first episode, "Big Brother", was transmitted on BBC One at 8.30 pm on 8 September that year. It attracted 9.2 million viewers and generally received a lukewarm response from critics. The viewing figures for the whole first series averaged at around 7 million viewers. According to an interview with John Challis in 2015, the viewing figure "today would be very good but in those days wasn't considered great at all, so it was sort of put on the back burner for a bit – no particular plans for a second series". The costumes for the first series were designed by Phoebe De Gaye. Del's attire was inspired by her going to car boot sales. She took Jason shopping in Oxford Street, and had him try a variety of suits. De Gaye purchased some gaily coloured Gabicci shirts, which were fashionable at the time and she thought "horrible". Del's rings and bracelet were made of fake gold and came from Chapel Market. Rodney's combat jacket came from the BBC's Costume Department, and De Gaye added a Yasser Arafat scarf purchased from Shepherd's Bush Market. De Gaye used Vaseline, make-up, and food to make Grandad's costume look dirty. The idea was that he never had his hat off, never dressed properly and usually had dirty pyjamas underneath his clothes.

A second series was commissioned for 1982. This fared a bit better, and the first and second series had a collective repeat run in June 1983 in a more low-key time slot, but attracted a high enough viewing figure for Davies to commission a third series. From there, the show began to top the television ratings. Viewing figures for the fourth series were double those of the first. In early December 1984, during the filming of Series 4, Lennard Pearce suffered a heart attack and was taken to hospital. He died on 15 December, the day before he was due to return. Sullivan wrote Grandad's death into the series with the episode "Strained Relations" which featured Del and Rodney's goodbye to Grandad. According to Sullivan, recasting Grandad was considered disrespectful to Pearce by the team, so it was decided that another older family member was to be cast. Buster Merryfield was then cast as Grandad's brother Albert. The scenes from "Hole in One" that featured Pearce were re-filmed with Merryfield.

Midway through the filming of the fifth series, Jason told Sullivan that he wished to leave the show in order to further his career elsewhere. Sullivan thus wrote "Who Wants to Be a Millionaire?", which was intended to be the final episode and would see Del accepting a friend's offer to set up business in Australia, leaving Rodney and Albert behind. Plans were made for a spin-off entitled Hot-Rod, which would have followed Rodney's attempts to survive on his own with help from Mickey Pearce, but leaving open the prospect of Del's return. Jason then changed his mind, and the ending of the episode was changed to show Del rejecting the offer.

Sullivan had a tendency to write scripts that were too long, meaning a lot of good material had to be cut. Shortly before filming of the sixth series began, he and Jason requested that the show's time slot be extended and it was agreed to extend its running time to 50 minutes. This required a 40 per cent increase in the show's budget, and coincided with the show's becoming one of the BBC's most popular programmes. Robin Stubbs became the costume designer for the sixth series, and was responsible for getting Del's attire to match his new yuppy image. His new suits cost around £200 each and were purchased from Austin Reed in Regent Street. The rest came from stores such as Tie-Rack and Dickins & Jones. His jewellery was replaced each series because it was very cheap (the rings with "D" cost 50p each).

The seventh series aired in early 1991. Jason and Sullivan were involved with other projects, and it was confirmed that there were no plans for a new series. Despite this, the show continued in Christmas specials until 1993. Sullivan nonetheless wanted a final episode to tie up the show. In late 1996, three more one-hour episodes were filmed, to be broadcast over Christmas 1996. All three were well received and, due to the ending, were assumed to be the last. The show made a return in Christmas 2001 with the first of three new episodes which were shot together but ultimately broadcast over three consecutive Christmases from 2001 until 2003. Despite rumours of further episodes, in a 2008 interview, Sullivan was quoted as saying: "There will not be another series of Only Fools And Horses. I can say that. We had our day, it was wonderful but it is best to leave it now". Though Sullivan died in 2011, it returned for a special Sport Relief episode in 2014.

Theme music and titles 

Only Fools and Horses has separate theme songs for the opening and closing credits, "Only Fools and Horses" and "Hooky Street", respectively. The original theme tune was produced by Ronnie Hazlehurst and recorded on 6 August 1981 at Lime Grove Studios. Alf Bigden, Paul Westwood, Don Hunt, John Dean, Judd Proctor, Eddie Mordue, and Rex Morris were hired to play the music. The tune was changed after the first series, and the new one was written by John Sullivan (he disliked the tune for the first series, and his new one explained the show's title), and Hazlehurst conducted it. It was recorded at Lime Grove on 11 May 1982, with musicians John Horler, Dave Richmond, Bigden, and Proctor. Sullivan had intended Chas & Dave to sing it because they had enjoyed success with the "Rockney" style, a mixture of rock n' roll and traditional Cockney music. Sullivan was persuaded to do it himself by Ray Butt. Despite the creation of a new theme tune, the original one remained in occasional use. Chas & Dave did later contribute to the show, performing the closing credits song for the 1989 episode "The Jolly Boys' Outing". Both songs are performed by Sullivan himself, and not – as is sometimes thought – by Nicholas Lyndhurst.

The opening credits see images of the three principal actors peel on and off the screen sequentially. These appear over a background of still photographs of everyday life in London. The sequence was conceived by graphic designer Peter Clayton as a "metaphor for the vagaries of the Trotters' lifestyle", whereby money was earned and quickly lost again. Clayton had also considered using five-pound notes bearing Del's face. The action was shot manually frame by frame, and took around six weeks to complete. Clayton knew that it was important to have the characters established in the titles, and prepared a storyboard depicting his ideas using drawings. He photographed various locations with a photographer, and the titles were shot using a rostrum camera and not edited. Brian Stephens, a professional animator, was hired to create the labels' movement.

Clayton returned to the show when the closing credits were changed for "Christmas Crackers". He re-cut the entire sequence and added Christmas items. Another change was made necessary by Lennard Pearce's death and Buster Merryfield joining the cast, so the pictures of David Jason and Nicholas Lyndhurst were updated too. The sequence was shot on motor drive.

The closing credits for the programme varied series by series. The first series used peeling labels featuring the names of the cast and crew, mirroring the opening sequence, but these had to be updated with every new episode, making the process very time-consuming; from the second series the credits switched to a standard rolling format. The third series featured additional symbols. For the fourth series, these designs were replaced with white lettering on a black background. The fifth series had a black and white background, but the sixth series reverted to the black one. For the seventh series, the credits scrolled against a freeze frame of the final scene.

Filming locations 
The original "Nelson Mandela House" in the titles was Harlech Tower, Park Road East, Acton, London. From 1988 onwards, Whitemead House, Duckmoor Road, Ashton in Bristol was used. The tower block is located behind Ashton Gate, the home ground of both Bristol City Football Club and the Bristol Bears, with some scenes filmed in the stadium's carpark.

Episodes 

Sixty-four episodes of Only Fools and Horses, all written by John Sullivan, were broadcast on BBC1 from 8 September 1981 until 25 December 2003. The show was aired in seven series (1981–1983, 1985–1986, 1989 and 1990–1991), and thereafter in sporadic Christmas special editions (1991–1993, 1996, 2001–2003). All earlier episodes had a running time of 30 minutes, but this was extended after Series Six (1989), and all subsequent episodes had a running time ranging from 50 to 95 minutes.

Several mini-episodes were produced. An eight-minute episode aired on 27 December 1982 as part of a show hosted by Frank Muir, The Funny Side of Christmas, and attracted 7.2 million viewers. A 5-minute spoof BBC documentary was shown on Breakfast Time on 24 December 1985, with Del being investigated by a BBC consumer expert. An educational episode named "Licensed to Drill", in which Del, Rodney and Grandad discuss oil drilling, was recorded in 1984 but only shown in schools. A 5-minute 1990–91 Persian Gulf War special (dated 1 December 1990) has Del, Rodney, and Albert convey a message to British troops serving in the conflict. It has never been broadcast commercially, but a copy exists at the Imperial War Museum, London. A Comic Relief special showing Del, Rodney and Albert making an appeal for donations was shown on 14 March 1997, with 10.6 million viewers. A Sport Relief special was aired on 21 March 2014.

Only Fools and Horses had two producers: Ray Butt from 1981 to 1987, and Gareth Gwenlan thereafter. Seven directors were used: Martin Shardlow directed all episodes in series one, Bernard Thompson directed the 1981 Christmas special, Susan Belbin series four, and Mandie Fletcher series five. Butt directed series three and five, as well as the 1985, 1986 and 1987 Christmas specials. Tony Dow became the established director after 1988, directing all subsequent episodes, bar the first part of Miami Twice, which was directed by Gareth Gwenlan. John Sullivan was executive producer on seven of the final eight episodes.

Documentaries 
A BBC documentary titled "The Story of Only Fools and Horses" aired in December 2002. A six-part documentary series also titled "The Story of Only Fools and Horses", began on 29 August 2017 on Gold and finished on 3 October 2017. The series features rare and unseen footage from the archives and specially re-created moments from Del Boy's family and friends. On 27 December 2020, a special called "We Love Only Fools and Horses" was broadcast on Channel 5 in which various fans, actors and crew recalled the story of the series and why the show is still popular.

Spin-offs

The Green Green Grass 
A spin-off of Only Fools and Horses entitled The Green Green Grass, also written by John Sullivan and directed by Tony Dow, was first aired in the UK in September 2005. Sullivan had considered writing a sitcom around the popular characters of Boycie and Marlene (John Challis and Sue Holderness) since the mid-1980s, but it was not until the series finally ended that the idea came to fruition. The Green Green Grass saw Boycie and Marlene forced to leave Peckham by one-time Only Fools and Horses villains, the Driscoll Brothers, and included guest appearances by Denzil (Paul Barber) and Sid (Roy Heather). A second series of The Green Green Grass was broadcast in the UK in October 2006, a third in November 2007 and a fourth in January 2009.

Rock & Chips 
In 2003, it was reported that Sullivan was developing a prequel to the original series, Once Upon a Time in Peckham, which would feature Del as a youngster in the 1960s, and have a prominent role for his parents. In 2009, it was again reported that the BBC were considering commissioning the show, although nothing was confirmed. On 5 April 2009, Sullivan said that he was planning a prequel to Only Fools and Horses which would star Nicholas Lyndhurst as Freddie "The Frog" Robdal, a local criminal and Rodney's biological father; Robdal was the focus of the episode "The Frog's Legacy".

On 3 July 2009, the BBC revealed that the title of the spin-off would be Sex, Drugs & Rock ‘n’ Chips, and would be a 90-minute comedy drama. The title was subsequently changed to Rock & Chips. Filming began in August 2009, and it was shown on BBC One at 9pm on 24 January 2010. In October 2009 it was confirmed that Lyndhurst would star as Robdal. The Inbetweeners and Off The Hook actor James Buckley played the role of the young Del Boy.

Home media 
The show has been released on VHS, DVD and audio CD in several guises. A DVD collection containing every episode was issued, along with various other special edition box-sets, such as a tin based on their Reliant Regal. Videos and DVDs of Only Fools and Horses continue to be among the BBC's biggest-selling items, having sold over 1 million VHS copies and 6 million DVD copies in the UK.

The series made its debut on Blu-ray on 6 December 2021, with a three-disc set entitled Only Fools and Horses: The 80s Specials. It featured the five feature length Christmas specials broadcast from 1985 to 1989, restored and remastered in high-definition. For the restoration process, the original 16mm film elements were cleaned and rescanned, while the standard-definition videotape elements were "digitally reprocessed" and upscaled to HD. On the set, the episode "A Royal Flush" is featured both in its original and "writer's cut" versions; "The Jolly Boys' Outing" is fully uncut; and various photo galleries, a booklet and artcards are also included.
It entered and peaked at #10 on the U.K. Official Blu-Ray Chart the week ending 18 December 2021.

In other media

Audio 
Four episodes ("The Long Legs of the Law", "A Losing Streak", "No Greater Love" and "The Yellow Peril") were re-edited for audio purposes and released on audio cassette on 12 October 1998. The cassette was re-released in October 2000.

Theatre 
A four-minute show named "Royal Variety Performance" was shown on 27 November 1988 (viewed by 18.14 million people) and had Del, Rodney, and Albert appear on the Royal Variety Show. It was staged on 24 November 1986, and the plot saw David Jason, Nicholas Lyndhurst and Buster Merryfield appear on stage in character, thinking that they are delivering boxes of alcohol to an associate of Del's, only later realising where they actually are. They also mistake the Duchess of York for Del's associate.

An idea of an Only Fools and Horses stage show was mooted by Ray Butt, following the success of other sitcom crossovers such as Dad's Army and Are You Being Served?. Sullivan was not keen, owing to his work on Just Good Friends as well as Only Fools and Horses, and inexperience with the theatre, so nothing came of it.

Stage musical 

In July 2018, John Sullivan's son, Jim Sullivan, announced that an Only Fools and Horses musical was nearing completion, with a script by Jim Sullivan and Paul Whitehouse. Jim Sullivan said, "Back in 2010 my Dad had been toying with the possibility of a stage show but sadly didn’t get the chance to commit to it. In 2015 we met with the producer, Phil McIntyre, and agreed to develop the idea.  Soon after that, Paul Whitehouse came on board and things have been bubbling away ever since. I am very pleased and excited to say that the show will be launching early next year." The musical launched on 9 February 2019 at the Theatre Royal Haymarket, London.

Books 
Only Fools and Horses spawned many merchandising spin-offs. Several books have been published, such as "The Only Fools and Horses Story" by Steve Clark and "The Complete A-Z of Only Fools and Horses" by Richard Webber, both of which detail the history of the series. The scripts have been published in a three-volume compendium, "The Bible of Peckham".

In October 2015, He Who Dares..., a fictional autobiography, was published by Ebury Press. The book was written by John Sullivan's son, Jim Sullivan.

In August 2017, Only Fools and Horses: The Peckham Archives, was published by Ebury Press. The book was written by Rod Green, with the help of Jim Sullivan.

In November 2018, You Know It Makes Sense, Lessons From The Derek Trotter School of Business (And Life), was published by Ebury Press. The book was written by John Sullivan's son, Jim Sullivan.

Board games 
Two board games based on the show were released: a Monopoly-style game, the "Trotters Trading Game", in which participants attempt to emulate the Trotters and become millionaires, and another game set in their local pub, entitled the "Nag's Head Board Game".

Reception 

Only Fools and Horses is one of the UK's most popular sitcoms. It was among the ten most-watched television shows of the year in the UK in 1986, 1989, 1990, 1991, 1992, 1993, 1996, 2001, 2002 and 2003. The 1996 Christmas trilogy of "Heroes and Villains", "Modern Men" and "Time on Our Hands" saw the show's peak. 21.3 million viewers watched the first two installments while the third (said to be the show's final episode at the time of broadcast) attracted 24.3 million, a record audience for a British sitcom. Repeat episodes also attract millions of viewers, and the BBC has received criticism for repeating the show too often.

Only Fools and Horses won the BAFTA award for best comedy series in 1985, 1988 and 1996, was nominated in 1983, 1986, 1989, 1990 and 1991, and won the audience award in 2004. David Jason received individual BAFTAs for his portrayal of Del Boy in 1990 and 1996. The series won a National Television Award in 1997 for most popular comedy series; Jason won two individual awards, in 1997 and 2002. At the British Comedy Awards, the show was named best BBC sitcom for 1990, and received the People's Choice award in 1997. It also won the Royal Television Society best comedy award in 1997 and two Television and Radio Industries Club Awards for comedy programme of the year, in 1984 and 1997. John Sullivan received the Writers' Guild of Great Britain comedy award in 1997.

The show regularly features in polls to find the most popular comedy series, moments and characters. It was voted Britain's Best Sitcom in a 2004 BBC poll,
and came 45th in the British Film Institute's list of the 100 Greatest British Television Programmes. It was 3rd on a subsequent viewers' poll on the BFI website. Empire magazine ranked Only Fools and Horses #42 on their list of the 50 greatest television shows of all time. It was also named the funniest British sitcom of all time through a scientific formula, in a study by Gold. Scenes such as Del Boy's fall through a bar flap in "Yuppy Love" and the Trotters accidentally smashing a priceless chandelier in "A Touch of Glass" are recognisable comedy moments, invariably topping polls of comedy viewers. Del Boy was voted the most popular British TV character of all time in a survey by Open.... and in a 2001 Channel 4 poll he ranked fourth on their list of the 100 Greatest TV Characters. A Onepoll survey found that Only Fools and Horses was the television series Britons would most like to see return.

Ratings

Cultural impact 

In addition to its mainstream popularity, Only Fools and Horses has developed a cult following. The Only Fools and Horses Appreciation Society, established in 1993, has a membership of around 7,000, publishes a quarterly newsletter, Hookie Street, and organises annual conventions of fans, usually attended by cast members. The Society has also organised an Only Fools and Horses museum, containing props from the series, including Del's camel coat and the Trotters' Ford Capri. It was named one of the top 20 cult television programmes of all time by TV critic Jeff Evans. Evans spoke of:

Only Fools and Horses – and consequently John Sullivan – is credited with the popularisation in Britain of several words and phrases used by Del Boy, particularly
"Plonker", meaning a fool or an idiot, and two expressions of delight or approval: "Cushty" (from the Roma word for "good")  and "Lovely jubbly". The latter was borrowed from an advertising slogan for a popular 1960s orange juice drink, called Jubbly, which was packaged in a pyramid shaped, waxed paper carton. Sullivan remembered it and thought it was an expression Del Boy would use; in 2003, the phrase was incorporated into the new Oxford English Dictionary.

Owing to its exposure on Only Fools and Horses, the Reliant Regal van is often linked with the show in the British media. The one used by the Trotters has attained cult status and is currently on display at the Cars of the Stars exhibition at the National Motor Museum, alongside many other vehicles from British and American television and movies, such as the Batmobile and the DeLorean from Back to the Future. Boxer Ricky Hatton, a fan of the show, purchased one of the original vans in 2004. Another of the vans used in the series was sold at auction in the UK for £44,000 in February 2007.

During the media frenzy surrounding The Independents revelations that the new bottled water Dasani, marketed by Coca-Cola, was in fact just purified tap water from Sidcup, mocking parallels were made with the Only Fools and Horses episode, "Mother Nature's Son", in which Del sells tap water as "Peckham Spring".

Rose Tyler's father Pete Tyler is referred to as "a bit of a Del Boy" in the 2005 Doctor Who episode "Father's Day".

In the closing ceremony of the 2012 London Olympics, the Trotters' yellow Reliant van appeared on stage, along with Del Boy and Rodney body doubles dressed as Batman and Robin, a reference to the Only Fools and Horses episode "Heroes and Villains".

International remakes 
Only Fools and Horses was sold to countries throughout the world. Australia, Belgium, Cyprus, Greece, Ireland, Israel, Malta, New Zealand, Pakistan, Portugal, South Africa, Spain and Yugoslavia are among those who purchased it. In all former Yugoslav countries in which Serbian or Croatian is spoken the title was Mućke (or Мућке in Cyrillic script), which can roughly be translated as "shady deals". This translation was also used in Macedonia, where the show was titled Spletki (Сплетки in Cyrillic). In Slovenia, however, the show was titled Samo bedaki in konji, which is a literal Slovenian translation of the original English title. The show has enjoyed particular popularity in Serbia where it has achieved cult status. In Hungary, the first three series were on air on Danube TV channel with title: Csak kötözött bolondoknak.

A number of overseas re-makes have also been produced. A Dutch version aired for one series in 1995, entitled Wat schuift 't? ("What's it good for?"). The Trotters were renamed the Aarsmans and it starred Johnny Kraaykamp jnr. as Stef (Del), Sacco Van der Made as Grandad and Kasper van Kooten as Robbie (Rodney), and was shown on RTL 4. A Portuguese re-make, O Fura-Vidas, a local expression for someone who lives outside the law, ran for three series from 1999 to 2001. It was a literal translation of the British version, with all episodes based on the originals. It centred on the Fintas family, who live in Sapadores, a neighbourhood in Lisbon, and starred Miguel Guilherme as Quim (Del), Canto e Castro as Grandad, and Ivo Canelas as Joca (Rodney). In this Portuguese version the Reliant's equivalent was a 1988 Suzuki Super Carry. A Slovenian re-make, called Brat bratu (Brother to Brother), was broadcast from 2008 to 2009. All episodes were based on the original British storylines, and it was made in co-operation with John Sullivan. It featured brothers Brane (Brane Šturbej) and Bine (Jure Drevenšek), who moved from Maribor to Ljubljana. The series also stars Peter Ternovšek as Grandad. It was directed by Branko Đurić. The series was cancelled after thirteen episodes due to poor ratings.

There have been several plans to produce an American version. One was to be a star vehicle for former M*A*S*H actor Harry Morgan, with Grandad rather than Del becoming the lead character. The other, entitled This Time Next Year..., would have seen the Trotters renamed the Flannagans. A draft script was written for the latter, but neither show materialised. In 2010 Steve Carell, star of the US version of The Office, expressed an interest in making an American version of the series, with him to star as Del Boy. In January 2012 US network ABC commissioned a pilot of an Only Fools and Horses remake titled "King of Van Nuys", written by Scrubs writers Steven Cragg and Brian Bradley. It was developed, rejected and then redeveloped, only to be rejected again later in the year. The pilot starred John Leguizamo as Del, Dustin Ybarra as his brother Rodney and Christopher Lloyd as Grandad.

A parody called Only Jerks and Horses was written by David Walliams and Matt Lucas and directed by Edgar Wright in 1997.

Notes

References

External links 

 
 
 Only Fools and Horses at Facebook
 Only Fools and Horses at UKTV Gold
 
 
 
 Only Fools and Horses at British TV Comedy Guide
 Only Fools and Horses Appreciation Society
 Audio interviews with the cast, and photos from an Only Fools and Horses Day in Swindon in 2004 at ***BBC Wiltshire
 Filming locations from Only Fools and Horses

 
1981 British television series debuts
2003 British television series endings
1980s British sitcoms
1990s British sitcoms
2000s British sitcoms
BAFTA winners (television series)
BBC Radio comedy programmes
BBC television sitcoms
English-language television shows
Peckham
Television shows shot in Bristol
Television series about brothers
Television series about dysfunctional families
Television shows set in London
Television series by BBC Studios